Prumnopitys exigua is a species of conifer in the family Podocarpaceae. It is found only in Bolivia, but probably also in northernmost Argentina and southernmost Peru.

References

exigua
Data deficient plants
Taxonomy articles created by Polbot